Medininkai ('foresters, woodsmen', formerly) is a village in Kėdainiai district municipality, in Kaunas County, in central Lithuania. According to the 2011 census, the village had a population of 62 people. There is a former school.

History
At the beginning of the 20th century there were Medininkai village and estate.

Demography

Images

References

Villages in Kaunas County
Kėdainiai District Municipality